Tinio is a surname. Notable people with the surname include:

 Antonio Tinio, Filipino educator and activist
 Justine Gail Tinio (born 1995), Filipino fencer
 Manuel Tinio (1877–1924), Filipino revolutionary
 Rolando Tinio (1937–1997), Filipino writer

Tagalog-language surnames